Breng Valley (The Golden Crown of Kashmir) is located in Anantnag district in the Indian territory of Jammu and Kashmir. The valley is named after the rivulet Brengi which is a tributary of famous Jhelum River. The valley spans over 40 km on either side of Brengi and Kokernag is the center of the valley where famous Kokernag Garden is located. The valley has been praised by the Kashmiri Sufi saint Sheikh Noor-u-din Wali as Breng Gov Sonsun Preng, i.e. Breng Valley is a Golden Crown.

Anantnag district
Valleys of Jammu and Kashmir